Geoffrey Louis Owens (born March 18, 1961) is an American actor known for his role as Elvin Tibideaux on The Cosby Show (1985–1992). He is the son of United States Congressman Major Owens.

Early life and education
Owens was born in Brooklyn, New York, to Ethel (née Werfel), a music and literature teacher, and Major Owens, a librarian who later went on to serve in the New York State Senate and the United States House of Representatives. He has two brothers and two half-siblings from his father's second marriage. Owens attended the High School of Performing Arts for a year and graduated cum laude from Yale University in 1983.

Career
One of Owens's earliest roles was in an Arcata High School theater performance where he played the title role in a performance of Peter Pan. This initial outing was what galvanized him to become an actor later in life.

In 1985, Owens made his television debut on the second season of the NBC sitcom The Cosby Show as Sondra Huxtable's boyfriend Elvin Tibideaux. Tibideaux married Sondra and became a regular character in 1987 and appeared on the series until it ended in 1992.

He has appeared as a lawyer on season 6 episode 1 of Elementary. He has appeared as himself on the FX sitcom It's Always Sunny in Philadelphia. In the season 3 episode "The Gang Gets Invincible" he appears at the Philadelphia Eagles' public tryouts as an actor pretending to be Donovan McNabb doing a plug for McDonald's but the gang recognize him as "that guy from The Cosby Show" who played "Sondra's husband ... ". In the season 7 episode "Frank's Pretty Woman" he plays the same character, this time pretending to be Tiger Woods. Dee, however, recognizes him and calls him out as the guy who pretended to be McNabb at the Eagles' tryouts. He then admits he is not Tiger Woods but then claims to be actor Don Cheadle. In the second episode of Season 15, "The Gang Makes Lethal Weapon 7", he appears as the same character, but is given the role to play as Roger Murtaugh in the gang’s Lethal Weapon 7 movie.

In 2007, Owens guest-starred as Eddie's father in the That's So Raven episode "The Way We Were". He also appeared on the season premiere of NBC's Las Vegas.

In 2008, he appeared alongside Paul Campbell, Andy Griffith, Doris Roberts, Liz Sheridan, Marla Sokoloff and Juliette Jeffers in the romantic comedy Play The Game.

In 2010, he appeared on ABC Family's The Secret Life of the American Teenager as a court-appointed mediator. He also appeared on the ABC show FlashForward in the episode "The Garden of Forking Paths", playing a researcher.

In 2011, Owens portrayed the role of Casca at the Shakespeare Theatre Company in its Free-For-All production of Julius Caesar.

In 2015, he portrayed an obstetrician on the NBC drama series The Slap, in an episode entitled "Ritchie".

In 2017, he portrayed an assistant dean on the FOX drama series Lucifer, in an episode entitled "Deceptive Little Parasite".

In 2018, photos of Owens working in a Trader Joe's were published by The Daily Mail, which many characterized as "job shaming." Owens agreed with the "job shaming" characterization, eventually quitting due to the unwanted attention. The story led producer Tyler Perry to offer Owens a ten-episode role in The Haves and the Have Nots. Owens also booked a guest-starring role on NCIS: New Orleans and  supporting roles in the films Fatale and Hide and Seek.

In 2020, he starred in the film Impossible Monsters, where he played a police detective. "I’m usually cast as dads, lawyers, doctors, teachers, and so to play a detective it was really fun," he said. He has now gained a supporting role in Power Book II: Ghost.

Teaching 
Owens is the founder and artistic director of The Brooklyn Shakespeare Company. He has taught acting and Shakespeare at Columbia University, Yale, the Adult School of Montclair and Pace University. In addition to developing his own private Shakespeare workshop, he has been a guest teacher at universities, theaters, studios and high schools in the New York metropolitan area. He has also served as a judge for the National Shakespeare Competition semi-finals at Lincoln Center for at least 25 years.

Personal life
In 1995, Owens married his wife, Josette. Together they have one son.

Filmography

Film

Television

References

External links

American male film actors
American male television actors
African-American male actors
1961 births
Living people
John Dewey High School alumni
Yale University alumni
20th-century American male actors
21st-century American male actors